House of Wax is a 1953 American period mystery-horror film directed by Andre DeToth. A remake by Warner Bros. of their 1933 film Mystery of the Wax Museum, it stars Vincent Price as a disfigured sculptor who repopulates his destroyed wax museum by murdering people and using their wax-coated remains as displays. The film premiered in New York on April 10, 1953, and had a general release on April 25, making it the first 3D film with stereophonic sound to be presented in a regular theater and the first color 3D feature film from a major American studio  (Columbia Pictures' Man in the Dark, the first major-studio black-and-white 3D feature, premiered two days before House of Wax).

In 1971, the film was re-released to theaters in 3D with a full advertising campaign. Newly struck prints of the film in Chris Condon's single-strip StereoVision 3D format were used for this release. Another major re-release occurred during the 3D boom of the early 1980s. Warner Bros. released a very loose remake of the film in 2005, but it was poorly-received.

The Library of Congress selected House of Wax for preservation in the National Film Registry in 2014, deeming it "culturally, historically, or aesthetically significant".

Plot
In New York City in the early 1900s, Professor Henry Jarrod is a talented sculptor who runs a wax museum. He creates wax statues of historical figures, but his business partner, Matthew Burke, is frustrated that Jarrod will not make more sensational exhibits, like those that draw crowds to their competitors, and wants to end their partnership. A friend brings wealthy art critic Sidney Wallace to see the museum, and Wallace indicates he may be interested in buying Burke out when he gets back from Egypt in three months, but Burke says he needs money sooner than that for another investment opportunity and suggests burning down the museum to collect a $25,000 insurance policy. To Jarrod's horror, Burke then starts a fire, which spreads rapidly, and the two men fight while Jarrod's wax masterworks melt. Burke gets the better of Jarrod and leaves, and Jarrod is still inside when the building explodes.

Overcoming the fact that Jarrod's body was never found, Burke is able to get all of the insurance money for himself. A disfigured man in a cloak strangles him and stages the murder to look like a suicide, and a few weeks later the same man murders Burke's fiancée, Cathy Gray. Her unemployed roommate, Sue Allen, comes home and stumbles upon the murderer. She flees and he gives chase, but she makes it to her friend Scott Andrews' home. That night, the disfigured man steals Cathy's body from the morgue by lowering it out the window to two accomplices.

Wallace receives a letter from Jarrod and learns he miraculously survived the fire, though he now uses a wheelchair and his hands are too damaged to sculpt. Jarrod asks Wallace to invest in a new wax museum, which will feature statues made by his assistants Igor, who is deaf and mute, and Leon Averill. He hopes to recreate his favorite pieces from his old museum, but will also concede to popular taste by including a chamber of horrors showcasing acts of violence from the past and present, including the apparent suicide of Burke, whose corpse went missing from the morgue.

Sue attends the opening of Jarrod's museum with Scott and is troubled by how much the Joan of Arc statue looks like Cathy. Jarrod overhears her and claims he based the figure on photos of Cathy he saw in the newspaper. He then hires Scott, who is a sculptor protégé of Wallace, as an assistant and asks Sue to model for a new Marie Antoinette statue, as she strongly resembles his earlier one.

Believing Cathy's body was used to make the Joan of Arc statue, Sue talks to Detective Lieutenant Tom Brennan. He agrees to investigate Jarrod and his museum and Sergeant Jim Shane recognizes Averill as a criminal wanted for breaking parole. Shane arrests Averill, who has a pocketwatch belonging to a missing deputy city attorney on him, though he says he found it.

The same night, Sue arrives at the museum after hours to meet with Scott, but Jarrod sent him on an errand when he heard she was coming. Not finding anyone around, she pulls a brunette wig off the Joan of Arc statue, exposing Cathy's blonde hair underneath, which proves to her that the figure is indeed Cathy's wax-coated body. Jarrod observes her discovery and gets up from his wheelchair. He grabs Sue and she strikes him, shattering a wax mask that concealed his disfigured face. Sue recognizes Jarrod as the murderer and faints.

To get a drink, Averill, an alcoholic, tells Brennan that many of Jarrod's figures have real bodies under the wax. As the police race to the House of Wax and Jarrod prepares to turn Sue into his beloved Marie Antoinette, Scott returns to the museum and, finding Sue's purse next to the wig and wheelchair, searches for her. Igor tries to stop him and they tussle, and the police arrive just in time to prevent Igor from decapitating Scott with the guillotine in one of the displays. The police storm into Jarrod's workshop and Jarrod fights them off until he is knocked into a vat of hot wax. Brennan moves Sue out of the way before the wax pours over her.

Cast

 Vincent Price as Professor Henry Jarrod, a mad and disfigured sculptor 
 Frank Lovejoy as Detective Lieutenant Tom Brennan, a detective on the wax museum Murder case 
 Phyllis Kirk as Sue Allen and Marie Antoinette
 Carolyn Jones as Cathy Gray, Sue's roommate
 Paul Picerni as Scott Andrews, Sue's friend and a sculptor
 Roy Roberts as Matthew Burke, Jarrod's business partner
 Angela Clarke as Mrs. Andrews, Scott's mother
 Paul Cavanagh as Sidney Wallace, a wealthy art critic who invests in Jarrod's museum
 Dabbs Greer as Sergeant Jim Shane, Tom's Partner on the wax museum murder case 
 Charles Bronson (credited as Charles Buchinsky) as Igor, Jarrod's assistant, who is deaf and mute
 Reggie Rymal as the barker with paddle balls
 Philip Tonge as Bruce Allison, Jarrod's friend, who brings Wallace to the museum (uncredited)
 Ruth Warren as the scrubwoman who finds Burke's corpse (uncredited)
 Riza Royce as Ma Flannigan, who runs the rooming house at which Sue and Cathy rent a room (uncredited)
 Frank Ferguson as the medical examiner (uncredited)
 Grandon Rhodes as the autopsy surgeon (uncredited)
 Eddie Parks as the senior morgue attendant (uncredited)
 Jack Woody as the junior morgue attendant (uncredited)
 Nedrick Young as Carl Hendricks/Leon Averill, Jarrod's assistant (uncredited)
 Mary Lou Holloway as Millie, a patron at Jarrod's museum (uncredited)
 Shirley Whitney as one of Millie's friends (uncredited)
 Joanne Brown as one of Millie's friends (uncredited)
 Oliver Blake as the pompous patron with a pocketwatch at Jarrod's museum (uncredited)

Production
 
Filmed under the working title The Wax Works, House of Wax was Warner Bros.' answer to the surprise 3D hit Bwana Devil, an independent production that premiered in November 1952. Seeing promise in the future of 3D films, Warner Bros. contracted Julian and Milton Gunzburg's Natural Vision 3D system, the same one used for Bwana Devil, and decided to film a remake of their 1933 two-color Technicolor thriller Mystery of the Wax Museum, which was based on Charles S. Belden's three-act play The Wax Works. Although the entire newspaper angle of the earlier film was eliminated and Mystery was set in the year it was released, whereas House of Wax was set in circa 1902, the two films have many similarities in plot and dialogue.

Among the foregrounded uses of 3D in the film were scenes featuring fights, can-can girls, and a paddle ball-wielding barker. In what may be the film's cleverest and most startling 3D effect, the shadowy figure of one of the characters seems to spring up out of the theater audience and run into the screen. As director Andre DeToth was blind in one eye, he was unable to experience stereo vision or 3D effects. Vincent Price recalled: "It’s one of the great Hollywood stories. When they wanted a director for [a 3D] film, they hired a man who couldn’t see 3D at all! André de Toth was a very good director, but he really was the wrong director for 3D. He’d go to the rushes and say 'Why is everybody so excited about this?' It didn’t mean anything to him. But he made a good picture, a good thriller. He was largely responsible for the success of the picture. The 3D tricks just happened—there weren’t a lot of them. Later on, they threw everything at everybody." Some modern critics feel DeToth's inability to see depth is what makes the film superior, since he was more concerned with telling a thrilling story and getting believable performances from the actors than simply tossing things at the camera.

Release
The film premiered in Los Angeles at the Paramount Theatre on April 16, 1953. It played at midnight with a number of celebrities in the audience, Broderick Crawford, Gracie Allen, Eddie Cantor, Rock Hudson, Judy Garland, Shelley Winters, and Ginger Rogers among them. Producer Alex Gordon, knowing actor Bela Lugosi was in dire need of cash, arranged for him to stand outside the theater wearing a cape and dark glasses and holding a leash with actor Steve Calvert in a gorilla suit on the end. Lugosi was interviewed by reporter Shirley Thomas, who thoroughly confused the aging star when she asked the prearranged questions out of order, and, embarrassed, he left without attending the screening. Footage of Lugosi in front of the theater appeared in a Pathé Newsreel released in theaters on April 27, 1953.

Topping the box office charts for five weeks and earning an estimated $5.5 million in rentals from the North American box office alone, the film was one of the biggest hits of 1953. It was originally available with a stereophonic three-track magnetic soundtrack to accompany its stereoscopic imagery, though many theaters were not equipped to make use of it and defaulted to the standard monophonic optical soundtrack. Previously, films with stereo sound were only produced to be shown in specialty cinemas, such as the Toldi in Budapest and the Telecinema in London. As of 2013, no copy of the original three-channel stereo soundtrack is known to exist, and only the monophonic soundtrack and a separate sound-effects-only track are believed to have survived, but a new stereo soundtrack has been synthesized from the available source material. The initial 3D screenings of the 88-minute film included an intermission, which was necessary to change the reels because each of the theater's two projectors was dedicated to one of the stereoscopic images.

Reception

Initial reception
Early reviews of the film were mostly mixed to negative. Variety was positive, writing: "This picture will knock 'em for a ghoul. Warners' House of Wax is the post-midcentury Jazz Singer. What the freres and Al Jolson did to sound, the Warners have repeated in third dimension." Harrison's Reports called the film "a first-class thriller of its kind", and "the best 3-D picture yet made", though the reviewer felt that "the added value of depth is not significant enough to warrant the annoyance of viewing the proceedings through the polaroid glasses, and that the picture would have been as much of a chiller if shown in the standard 2-D form, and probably even a greater thriller if shown on a wide screen." The Monthly Film Bulletin wrote that, as a 3D film, it was "a smoother effort than its predecessors, obviously made with more care and less tiring to the eyes", but that, "[i]n all but technical respects, the film is a childish and inept piece of work."

Bosley Crowther of The New York Times found the film "disappointing", writing: "This picture, apart entirely from the fact that it is baldly, unbelievably antique in its melodramatic plot and style, shows little or no imagination in the use of stereoscopic images and nothing but loudness and confusion in the use of so-called stereoscopic sound. The impression we get is that its makers were simply and solely interested in getting a flashy sensation on the screen just as fast as they could." Richard L. Coe of The Washington Post wrote: "It's supposed to be a horror movie and it's horrible alright... The novelty has some appeal especially through its long shots into depths, but there is also a feeling of limitations once what novelty there passes. Then it is we go back to the gaga script devised by Crane Wilbur from a story which served one of the early talking films and one is inclined to shudderingly ask: Are we to go through all that again?" John McCarten of The New Yorker also hated the film, writing that he thought it had "set the movies back about forty-nine years. It could have set them back further if there had been anything earlier to set them back to", and concluding that "when Mr. Price started clumping around and choking ladies with knots that wouldn't pass muster at a Cub Scout meeting, I took off my glasses once and for all, put on my hat, and left."

Later reception

On review aggregator website Rotten Tomatoes, the film has an approval rating of 93% based on 44 reviews and an average score of 7.5 out of 10. The site's "critics consensus" reads: "House of Wax is a 3-D horror delight that combines the atmospheric eerieness of the wax museum with the always chilling presence of Vincent Price."

Impact

House of Wax revitalized the film career of Vincent Price, who had been playing secondary character parts and occasional sympathetic leads since the late 1930s. After this high-profile role, he was in high-demand for the rest of his career to play fiendish villains, mad scientists, and other deranged characters in genre films such as The Tingler (1959), The Masque of the Red Death (1964), and The Abominable Dr. Phibes (1971). Supporting actress Carolyn Jones, who had her first credited role in House of Wax, gained a much higher profile more than a decade later when she played Morticia Addams in the TV comedy horror spoof The Addams Family.

Home media releases
 The film was released in 2D on DVD by Warner Home Video on August 5, 2003. This release included Mystery of the Wax Museum as a bonus.
 A 3D Blu-ray disc of the film was released in the U.S. on October 1, 2013, to celebrate its 60th anniversary. Like the earlier DVD, the Blu-ray includes Mystery of the Wax Museum as a bonus (in standard definition). A reissue of this format was released through the Warner Archive Collection on June 23, 2020.
 The film was shown on the MeTV show Svengoolie on May 7, 2022.

See also

 Mystery of the Wax Museum – the 1933 film of which House of Wax is a remake
 House of Wax – a 2005 film that is a loose remake of House of Wax
 Terror in the Wax Museum – a 1973 film
 Waxwork – a 1988 film
 List of 3D films of the era
 Vincent Price filmography

References

External links

 House of Wax essay by Jack Theakston on the National Film Registry website
 
 
 
 
 House of Wax at 3D Expo - with Paul Picerni Q&A at Hollywood Gothique
 Cinefantastique retrospective article

1953 3D films
1953 horror films
1953 films
1950s serial killer films
American 3D films
Remakes of American films
Films directed by Andre DeToth
Films scored by David Buttolph
Films set in New York City
Films set in museums
Films set in the 1890s
Horror film remakes
Mannequins in films
United States National Film Registry films
Warner Bros. films
1950s English-language films